Michael Arthur Haffner (born July 7, 1942) is a former professional American football player who played wide receiver for four seasons for the Denver Broncos (1968–1970) and Cincinnati Bengals (1971). 's NFL off-season, he still held the Broncos rookie franchise record for yards per reception at 30.5, for a 4 reception, 122 yard performance on 14 Dec 1968 against the Kansas City Chiefs.

Career 
After retirement, Haffner was a color commentator for the NFL on NBC. He is most noted for being the sideline reporter who inadvertently captured on his live microphone a two‐word expletive uttered by Terry Donahue who was voicing his disapproval over a Bruins interception being nullified due to a penalty in NBC's Christmas Day telecast of the 1978 Fiesta Bowl. Haffner and Donohue had been roommates at UCLA.

References

1942 births
Living people
American football wide receivers
Cincinnati Bengals players
Denver Broncos (AFL) players
Denver Broncos players
National Football League announcers
Sportspeople from Waterloo, Iowa
UCLA Bruins football players